Franco Rossi was a former Italian paralympic athlete, who won 13 medals (6 gold) in four editions of the Summer Paralympics (from 1960 to 1972).

See also
Italy at the Paralympics – Multiple medallists

References

External links
 

Paralympic archers of Italy
Paralympic swimmers of Italy
Paralympic table tennis players of Italy
Paralympic wheelchair fencers of Italy
Swimmers at the 1960 Summer Paralympics
Swimmers at the 1964 Summer Paralympics
Table tennis players at the 1960 Summer Paralympics
Wheelchair fencers at the 1960 Summer Paralympics
Wheelchair fencers at the 1964 Summer Paralympics
Wheelchair fencers at the 1968 Summer Paralympics
Wheelchair fencers at the 1972 Summer Paralympics
Medalists at the 1960 Summer Paralympics
Medalists at the 1964 Summer Paralympics
Medalists at the 1968 Summer Paralympics
Medalists at the 1972 Summer Paralympics
Paralympic medalists in swimming
Paralympic medalists in table tennis
Paralympic medalists in wheelchair fencing
Paralympic gold medalists for Italy
Paralympic silver medalists for Italy
Paralympic bronze medalists for Italy
1934 births
2001 deaths
Italian male fencers
Italian male table tennis players
20th-century Italian people